Els Pallaresos is a municipality in the comarca of the Tarragonès in Catalonia, Spain.

It is home to several buildings by Modernist architect Josep Maria Jujol.

References

 Panareda Clopés, Josep Maria; Rios Calvet, Jaume; Rabella Vives, Josep Maria (1989). Guia de Catalunya, Barcelona: Caixa de Catalunya.   (Catalan).  (Spanish).

External links
 Government data pages 

Municipalities in Tarragonès
Populated places in Tarragonès